Michael Goodfellow (born 8 October 1988) is a retired Scottish curler.

Career
As a youth, Goodfellow played in two Winter Universiades, one in 2009 and 2011. He played lead at the 2009 Winter Universiade for the British team, skipped by John Hamilton. They finished 7th. He was the British alternate at the 2011 Winter Universiade, on a team skipped by Glen Muirhead that finished 4th. Despite being the team's alternate, he played in 8 round robin games.

On the World Curling Tour, Goodfellow played lead for Jamie Dick for 2008–09 before joining with Muirhead for 2009–10 to play lead for him. He joined the Tom Brewster rink in 2010 and played lead for Brewster, and then for David Murdoch beginning in 2013.

With Brewster, Goodfellow won three straight Scottish championships between 2011 and 2013. With the team, he won silver medals at the 2011 Ford World Men's Curling Championship and 2012 World Men's Curling Championship and a bronze medal at the 2013 Ford World Men's Curling Championship with Murdoch as skip. Goodfellow played in two European Curling Championship as an altnerate on the team. At the 2012 European Curling Championships, the team finished 7th, and Goodfellow would play in 7 games. The team won a bronze medal at the 2013 European Curling Championships, with Goodfellow playing in 11 games. 

February 2014 saw Goodfellow make his Team GB Winter Olympic debut at the Sochi 2014 games alongside David Murdoch, Tom Brewster, Scott Andrews and Greg Drummond. The team took bronze at the 2013 European Championships. The team also represented Scotland at the 2017 World Men's Curling Championship, finishing in 6th. 

After on season playing for Greg Drummond, Goodfellow joined the Ross Paterson rink in 2018. The team went on to win the 2018 National Grand Slam of Curling event and a bronze medal at the 2019 European Curling Championships. 

Goodfellow retired from curling in 2021.

References

External links

Scottish male curlers
British male curlers
1988 births
Living people
Curlers at the 2014 Winter Olympics
Olympic curlers of Great Britain
Medalists at the 2014 Winter Olympics
Olympic silver medallists for Great Britain
Olympic medalists in curling
Curlers from Stirling